Sirius College is a private school established in 1997. Based in Melbourne, Victoria, the school, which has over ~3000 students, has campuses in Keysborough, Broadmeadows, Dallas, Sunshine West, and Shepparton. The college is a non-denominational school and welcomes students from all ethnic and religious backgrounds. The "Religion and Values" subject is taught as an elective.

History
In the early 1980s, a handful of Australian Turkish volunteers saw a desperate need to provide educational services for the Australian Turkish youth who were economically and socially disadvantaged during those times. As a result, these volunteers founded a non-profit community organization in 1988 and officially registered it as Selimiye Foundation Ltd. at the beginning of 1992. The foundation initially established a boarding House in 1992 to provide the young generation with assistance in their school studies, moral values and independence, and improvement in social skills. Towards the end of the same year, a tutoring centre was established to offer senior students preparing for university exams. At this stage, the Selimiye Foundation members decided to establish a school. Thus, Sirius College (formerly known as ISIK College) was established in 1997 on the former Eastmeadows Primary School site and began operation with only 28 students. The first years of operations for the campus saw an increase in enrolment demands, with 60 students by the end of the first year and 250 student enrolments by 1998, along with a new campus in Geelong. Two other campuses were later opened in 1999 (Mildura campus) and 2001 (Keysborough campus).

In 2005, Shepparton Campus commenced its operation as a primary school. In the same year, Meadow Fair Campus (formerly known as Upfield Campus) also started at its temporary location in Upfield Campus to offer year 7-12 educational programs for boys only. The campus was relocated to its new site in 2010. In the same year, Ibrahim Dellal, Sunshine Campus, commenced operation as a primary school. There were additional changes that occurred in 2010. In 2010, the college decided to stop Mildura Campus's operation and start operating as a tutoring centre and weekend language school.

In 2011, Geelong Campus was relocated and merged with the Ibrahim Dellal, Sunshine Campus, offering co-educational programs for years Prep – 10.

In January 2013, the school name was changed from ‘ISIK College’ to ‘Sirius College’. 

In 2015, Dallas Campus opened as the sixth campus of Sirius College.

The school celebrated its 20th anniversary in 2017.

References

Private schools in Melbourne
Educational institutions established in 1997
1997 establishments in Australia